Ambrose Joseph Murray (June 4, 1913 – February 6, 1997) was a Major League Baseball pitcher. He played one season with the Boston Bees in July 1936.

References

External links

Boston Bees players
1913 births
1997 deaths
Baseball players from Massachusetts
Sportspeople from Fall River, Massachusetts
Major League Baseball pitchers
People from Martin County, Florida